Ormonde Maddock Dalton, FBA (1866–1945) was a British museum curator and archaeologist.  Though very much an all-rounder, his main expertise was in medieval art.  He usually published as O. M. Dalton, but also wrote under the pseudonym W. Compton Leith.

From 1921 to 1928 he was Keeper of the British and Medieval Antiquities Department at the British Museum.  As well as the books below, he wrote a stream of articles and short books for the museum.

Works
Handbook to the Ethnographical Collections (1910) with Thomas Athol Joyce.
Byzantine Art and Archaeology (1911), handbook of art and artefacts.
East Christian Art (1925).

Translations
Gregory of Tours. The History of the Franks. 2 vol. trans. O. M. Dalton. Oxford: Clarendon Press, 1967
Josef Strzygowski, Origin of Christian Church Art' (1923), translation with Hermann Justus Braunholtz.

Notes

1866 births
1945 deaths
Employees of the British Museum
British art historians
British archaeologists
Byzantine archaeologists